Nasty is the sixth mixtape by American rapper Rico Nasty. It was released under Sugar Trap and Atlantic Records on June 15, 2018 shortly after the rapper signed to the latter. The record features appearances from rappers BlocBoy JB and Lil Gnar. Prior to the official release of Nasty, the songs "Trust Issues", "Rage" and "Countin' Up" were released chronologically as singles.

Background and release 
Rico Nasty released the record's lead single, "Trust Issues", and its music video on March 16, 2018. She released Nasty's second single "Rage" and its music video on May 11, 2018. On June 7, 2018, Rico Nasty announced the release of Nasty via social media. On June 11, she revealed the tracklist and also announced the dates for The Nasty Tour to support the mixtape. Nasty was officially released on June 15, 2018. The record's final single, "Countin' Up" was released on June 18, 2018. Rico Nasty embarked on The Nasty Tour in July.

Critical response

Reception 

Nasty received generally positive acclaim from music critics. At Album of the Year, which assigns a normalized rating out of 100 to reviews from professional publications, the mixtape received an average score of 69, based on 5 reviews.

Sheldon Pearce of Pitchfork described Nasty as "one of the hardest rap records of the year," and described Rico Nasty as a "ferocious 21-year-old shapeshifter". Trey Alston of Highsnobiety wrote that the record is "purposefully disorienting and confusing, but it sends its message effectively. Rico Nasty is here and changing, but, most importantly, not going anywhere." Israel Daramola of Spin wrote "Rico Nasty’s confidence is contagious, and her fusion of sounds make her a hypnotizing artist of the future" and described Nasty as "a cohesive and strong body of work–the kind of great summer album that is so energetic and unquestionably hard, that [Rico Nasty] only rise from here." Aaron Williams of Uproxx wrote that the record "bangs wall to wall, and Rico’s smirkingly confident personality shines through on every track". David Bromfield of Spectrum Culture noted that "While rising rappers often end up with their identities groomed out once they hit the big time, Nasty is the rare major-label debut at the intersection of artistry and intent."

In a slightly less positive review, Mosi Reeves of Rolling Stone wrote, "While her debut mixtape for Atlantic Records doesn't feel like a major creative breakthrough, it's a solid introduction to a dynamic, hard-charging voice in what Rico herself dubs 'sugar trap.'"

Accolades
Nasty appeared on multiple critic's lists.

Track listing 
Adapted from Tidal

Release history

References 

2018 mixtape albums
Atlantic Records albums
Rico Nasty albums